James Sterling Ridge, Sr. (October 29, 1936 – April 18, 2012) was an American politician.

Biography
Born in Alexandria, Louisiana, Ridge graduated from Glendale High School in Glendale, Arizona, Phoenix Community College, and Arizona State University. He was a newspaper reporter for the Arizona Republic and the Phoenix Gazette. He served in the Arizona House of Representatives from the 17th District from 1982 to 1988 and was a Republican. Ridge also served on the Glendale City Council and was mayor. He died in Glendale.

References

1936 births
2012 deaths
Politicians from Alexandria, Louisiana
Arizona State University alumni
Phoenix College alumni
Journalists from Arizona
Arizona city council members
Mayors of places in Arizona
People from Glendale, Arizona
Republican Party members of the Arizona House of Representatives